Ludworth is an area of Marple, Greater Manchester in Greater Manchester. Ludworth Civil Parish was created in 1896; it was part of Glossop Dale Rural District until 1934 when it was transferred to Chapel-en-le-Frith Rural District. In 1936 it was transferred, along with Mellor to Marple Urban District. In 1974 Marple Urban District became part of the Metropolitan Borough of Stockport in Greater Manchester. The civil parish consisted of Marple Bridge and the smaller Mill Brow. Though today Ludworth is not often used for the area, it does live on with the name of the primary school located in Marple Bridge. Ludworth and Lyme is also an area within the Stockport Girlguide organisational areas.

References

Geography of the Metropolitan Borough of Stockport
Towns and villages of the Peak District